Tredagh may refer to

 an area and alternative early spelling of Drogheda, Ireland
 , a 50-gun third-rate frigate, later renamed HMS Resolution
 , a paddle steamer passenger vessel